Białobłoty may refer to the following places:
Białobłoty, Greater Poland Voivodeship (west-central Poland)
Białobłoty, Kuyavian-Pomeranian Voivodeship (north-central Poland)
Białobłoty, Warmian-Masurian Voivodeship (north Poland)